Maher Ben Aziza (born 27 July 1980) is a Tunisian fencer. He competed in the individual foil events at the 2000 and 2004 Summer Olympics.

References

External links
 

1980 births
Living people
Tunisian male foil fencers
Olympic fencers of Tunisia
Fencers at the 2000 Summer Olympics
Fencers at the 2004 Summer Olympics
Mediterranean Games bronze medalists for Tunisia
Mediterranean Games medalists in fencing
Competitors at the 2001 Mediterranean Games
21st-century Tunisian people
20th-century Tunisian people